Emmanuel Palomares (born July 13, 1990, in Valera, Trujillo, Venezuela) is a Venezuelan television actor and model. He began his career aged 18 in the juvenile series Corazones extremos, broadcast by Venevisión. He took acting classes in the school, Luz Columba with Professor Nelsón Ortega. In 2013, he was selected in Mexico by Eugenio Cobo to enter the CEA of Televisa.

Filmography

References

External links 

1990 births
Venezuelan male telenovela actors
Venezuelan male models
Living people